HMS Cyclops was a 28-gun Enterprise-class sixth-rate frigate of the Royal Navy.  The Cyclops was first commissioned in July 1779 under the command of Captain John Robinson.

In January 1783 she captured the French 14-gun brig Railleur on the North American station.

Because Cyclops served in the navy's Egyptian campaign between 8 March 1801 and 2 September, her officers and crew qualified for the clasp "Egypt" to the Naval General Service Medal, which the Admiralty authorised in 1850 to all surviving claimants.

Notes, citations, and references
Notes

Citations

References
 Demerliac, Alain (1996) La Marine De Louis XVI: Nomenclature Des Navires Français De 1774 À 1792. (Nice: Éditions OMEGA). 
 Robert Gardiner, The First Frigates, Conway Maritime Press, London 1992. .
 David Lyon, The Sailing Navy List, Conway Maritime Press, London 1993. .
 Winfield, Rif (2007) British Warships in the Age of Sail 1714-1792: Design, Construction, Careers and Fates. (Seaforth). .

1779 ships
Sixth-rate frigates of the Royal Navy